The finite potential well (also known as the finite square well) is a concept from quantum mechanics. It is an extension of the infinite potential well, in which a particle is confined to a "box", but one which has finite potential "walls". Unlike the infinite potential well, there is a probability associated with the particle being found outside the box. The quantum mechanical interpretation is unlike the classical interpretation, where if the total energy of the particle is less than the potential energy barrier of the walls it cannot be found outside the box. In the quantum interpretation, there is a non-zero probability of the particle being outside the box even when the energy of the particle is less than the potential energy barrier of the walls (cf quantum tunnelling).

Particle in a 1-dimensional box
For the 1-dimensional case on the x-axis, the time-independent Schrödinger equation can be written as:

where
 is the reduced Planck's constant,
 is Planck's constant,
 is the mass of the particle,
 is the (complex valued) wavefunction that we want to find,
 is a function describing the potential energy at each point x, and
 is the energy, a real number, sometimes called eigenenergy.

The wavefunction is considered to be made up of different wavefunctions at different ranges of x, depending on whether x is inside or outside of the box. Therefore, the wavefunction is defined such that:

Inside the box
For the region inside the box, V(x) = 0 and Equation 1 reduces to

Letting 

the equation becomes

This is a well-studied differential equation and eigenvalue problem with a general solution of

Hence,

Here, A and B can be any complex numbers, and k can be any real number.

Outside the box 
For the region outside of the box, since the potential is constant,  and equation  becomes:

For a free particle, and letting  produces

with the same solution form as the inside-well case:

This analysis will focus on the bound state, where . Letting

produces

where the general solution is exponential:

Similarly, for the other region outside the box:

Now in order to find the specific solution for the problem at hand, we must specify the appropriate boundary conditions and find the values for A, B, F, G, H and I that satisfy those conditions.

Finding wavefunctions for the bound state
Solutions to the Schrödinger equation must be continuous, and continuously differentiable. These requirements are boundary conditions on the differential equations previously derived, that is, the matching conditions between the solutions inside and outside the well.

In this case, the finite potential well is symmetrical, so symmetry can be exploited to reduce the necessary calculations.

Summarizing the previous sections:

In order for the wave function to be square integrable, we must set , and we have:
 and 

Next, we know that the overall  function must be continuous and differentiable. In other words, the values of the functions and their derivatives must match up at the dividing points:

For the symmetric case we get

so taking the ratio gives

Similarly for the antisymmetric case we get 

Recall that both  and  depend on the energy. What we have found is that the continuity conditions cannot be satisfied for an arbitrary value of the energy; because that's a result of the infinite potential well case. Thus, only certain energy values, which are solutions to one or either of these two equations, are allowed. Hence we find that the energy levels of the system below  are discrete; the corresponding eigenfunctions are bound states. (By contrast, for the energy levels above  are continuous.)

The energy equations cannot be solved analytically. Nevertheless, we will see that in the symmetric case, there always exists at least one bound state, even if the well is very shallow.
Graphical or numerical solutions to the energy equations are aided by rewriting them a little.

Each purple or grey curve represents a possible solution,  within the range . The total number of solutions, (i.e., the number of purple/grey curves that are intersected by the blue circle) is therefore determined by dividing the radius of the blue circle, by the range of each solution  and using the floor or ceiling functions:

In this case there are exactly three solutions, since .

If we want, we can go back and find the values of the constants  in the equations now (we also need to impose the normalisation condition). On the right we show the energy levels and wave functions in this case (where ):

We note that however small  is (however shallow or narrow the well), there is always at least one bound state.

Two special cases are worth noting. As the height of the potential becomes large, the radius of the semicircle gets larger and the roots get closer and closer to the values , and we recover the case of the infinite square well.

As  it will tend to zero, and so there will only be one bound state. But this is just the energy of the bound state of a Delta function potential of strength , as it should be.

The normalized quantities are

giving directly the relation between the allowed couples  as

for the even and odd parity wave functions, respectively. In the previous equations only the positive derivative parts of the functions have to be considered. The chart giving directly the allowed couples  is reported in the figure.

Unbound states

If we solve the time-independent Schrödinger equation for an energy , the solutions will be oscillatory both inside and outside the well. Thus, the solution is never square integrable; that is, it is always a non-normalizable state. The non-normalizable eigenstates are close enough to being square integrable that they still contribute to the spectrum of the Hamiltonian as an unbounded operator.

Asymmetrical well
Consider a one-dimensional asymmetrical potential well given by the potential

and

The energy levels  are determined once  is solved as a root of the following transcendental equation

The results of symmetrical well is obtained from above equation by setting .

Spherical cavity

The results above can be used to show that, as to the one-dimensional case, there is two bound states in a spherical cavity, as spherical coordinates make equivalent the radius at any direction.

The ground state (n = 1) of a spherically symmetric potential will always have zero orbital angular momentum (ℓ = n−1), and the reduced wave function 

satisfies the equation

where  is the radial part of the wave function. Notice that for (n = 1) angular part is constant (ℓ = 0).

This is identical to the one-dimensional equation, except for the boundary conditions. As before, 

The energy levels for 

are determined once 

is solved as a root of the following transcendental equation

where 

Existence of root to above equation is always guaranteed.

The results are allways with spherical symmetry.

It fullfils the condition where the wave does not find any potential inside the sphere:

See also
Potential well
Delta function potential
Infinite potential well
Semicircle potential well
Quantum tunnelling
Rectangular potential barrier

References

Further reading

 .

Quantum mechanical potentials
Quantum models